Glenn R. Hansen (born April 21, 1952) is a retired American professional basketball player. He was born in Devils Lake, North Dakota.

Hansen, a 6'4" (1.93 m) and 205 lb (93 kg) guard, played college basketball for Louisiana State University and Utah State University.  As an underclassman he was selected in the 1974 ABA Draft in the ninth round by the Kentucky Colonels, but he stayed in college.  The following year, he was selected in the second round of the 1975 NBA draft by the Kansas City Kings and in the fourth round of the 1975 ABA Draft by the Memphis Sounds.

Hansen signed with the Kansas City Kings and played for them in the 1975–76 and 1976–77 NBA seasons, averaging 6.5 points per game and 2.8 rebounds per game as a rookie.  He played in two games the 1977–78 NBA season with the Chicago Bulls.

References

1952 births
Living people
American men's basketball players
Basketball players from North Dakota
Chicago Bulls players
Kansas City Kings draft picks
Kansas City Kings players
Kentucky Colonels draft picks
LSU Tigers basketball players
Memphis Sounds draft picks
People from Devils Lake, North Dakota
Shooting guards
Utah State Aggies men's basketball players